The Rah Ahan Stadium is a multi-purpose stadium in Tehran, Iran.  It is currently used mostly for football matches and is the home stadium of Rah Ahan F.C., who currently play in Iran's Premier Football League. 
The stadium was owned by Persepolis F.C. prior to 1975. The stadium holds 12,000 people.

Tournaments
The Stadium under the name of Persepolis Stadium along with Aryamehr Stadium and Amjadieh Stadium was the host of preliminary round of the football matches at the 1974 Asian Games (Group A and Group C).

Rah Ahan Stadium and Shahid Dastgerdi Stadium hosted the 2012 AFC U-16 Championship.

References

Football venues in Iran
Stadium
Multi-purpose stadiums in Iran
Sports venues in Tehran
Sports venues completed in 1973
1973 establishments in Iran